Torgallmenningen, Torgalmenningen, or Torvallmenningen, is the main square of Bergen, Norway.

Squares in Bergen